Max Takes Tonics (French: Max victime du quinquina) is a 1911 French film directed by Max Linder.

The film is also known as Max and His Prescription (United Kingdom) and Victime du quinquina (French alternative title).

Plot 
Max visits a doctor who prescribes a tonic (Bordeaux of Cinchona) for him to drink every morning.  Upon returning home, Max sees a large glass which was left by his wife and labeled "Souvenir de Bordeaux".  He consumes it in its entirety after assuming that it was his medicine.  Immediately Max feels much better.  Hilarity ensues as Max goes about the day in a completely drunken state.

Cast 
Max Linder as Max
Georges Coquet		
Lucy d'Orbel		
Maurice Delamare
Georges Gorby		
Gabrielle Lange		
Paulette Lorsy		
Jacques Vandenne

Soundtrack

External links 

French films of 1911
 

1911 films
1910s French-language films
French black-and-white films
1911 comedy films
Films directed by Max Linder
1911 short films
French silent short films
French comedy short films
Silent comedy films